St Michael the Archangel Church or simply St Michael's Church is an Anglican parish church located in Winterbourne, South Gloucestershire, on the northern fringe of Bristol. It was built in the 12th century and has been designated by English Heritage as a grade I listed building.

The Church is located to the west of Winterbourne, largely surrounded by fields and woodland, though a number of cottages flank it. Despite its rather isolated location its prominent spire is clearly visible for miles around. Behind the Church's most recent graveyard is the Monks Pool nature reserve and the Bradley Brook. Winterbourne Court, a 14th-century tithe barn, stands immediately adjacent to the Church.

In the churchyard's north-west corner is the war grave of a Devonshire Regiment soldier of World War II.

St Michael's is part of the Fromeside Partnership, an association between the local ecclesiastical parishes of Coalpit Heath, Frampton Cotterell, Winterbourne and Winterbourne Down.

References

External links

 St Michael's official website  (Link Broken)
 Guide to St Michael's Church

12th-century church buildings in England
Churches in South Gloucestershire District
Church of England church buildings in Gloucestershire
Civil Parish of Winterbourne
Diocese of Bristol
Grade I listed churches in Gloucestershire